Uppumaguluru is a gram panchayat in Ballikurava mandal, Prakasam District of Andhra Pradesh, India.  The gram panchayat includes Somavarappadu and Kotavaripalem villages. A majority of people depend on agriculture and a few people are involved in granite mining related work. It is in between the towns of Chilakaluripet and Narasaraopet in the Guntur district.

{
  "type": "FeatureCollection",
  "features": [
    {
      "type": "Feature",
      "properties": {},
      "geometry": {
        "type": "Point",
        "coordinates": [
          80.059432983398,
          16.07484669372
        ]
      }
    }
  ]
}

Local Government 
It falls into Addanki Constituency for state assembly and Bapatla Constituency for Lok Sabha.

Education 
Uppumaguluru has primary and secondary schools, educating students from the three villages in the gram panchayat.

Transport 
It has bus services from Chilakaluripet.

Services 
Bank of Baroda has started its services in Uppumaguluru along with ATM services.  A brick factory operates from this village. The famous Hindu pilgrimage centre Kotappakonda, is 15 km away from the village.

References 

Gram panchayats in Andhra Pradesh